Okay Airways is an airline headquartered in Daxing District, Beijing, People's Republic of China. It operates passenger flight services and dedicated cargo services. Its main hubs are Tianjin Binhai International Airport and Xi'an Xianyang International Airport, with a secondary hub is Changsha Huanghua International Airport.

History 

Okay Airways was established in June 2004 and in February 2005 received an aviation carrier business license from the Civil Aviation Administration of China (CAAC). It is China's first private sector airline. The carrier's maiden flight from its base in Tianjin to Changsha was on 11 March 2005, with 81 people on board.

 Okay Airways leased three Boeing 737-300F aircraft and started cargo services as a local partner of FedEx Express in March 2007.

Flights were suspended for one month beginning on 15 December 2008, due to a dispute between the carrier and its shareholders.

Corporate affairs
It is headquartered in Daxing District, Beijing.

Previously it was headquartered in an Air China office facility in Zone A of the Tianzhu Industrial Zone of Shunyi District, Beijing, and before in Fengtai District, Beijing.

Destinations 
As of September 2018, Okay Airways operates to:

Fleet

Current fleet
, Okay Airways operates an all-Boeing fleet consisting of the following aircraft:

Fleet development
In June 2017, the airline announced an order for 15 Boeing 737 MAX aircraft consisting of 7 737 MAX 8 and 8 737 MAX 10. In November 2017, the airline signed a firm order for 5 Boeing 787-9 aircraft.

Okay Airways used to have a regional fleet of 13 Xian MA-60. With the establishment of the new Joy Air on October 30, 2016, the regional fleet of Okay Airways (all the 13 Xian MA60) has been transferred to Joy Air.

Former fleet
The airline previously operated the following aircraft (as of August 2018):
 2 further Boeing 737-800

References

External links

Okay Airways 
Okay Airways Corporate  (Archive)
Okay Airways Fleet
 

Airlines of China
Airlines established in 2004
Privately held companies of China
Companies based in Beijing
Transport in Tianjin
Chinese brands
Chinese companies established in 2004